Throughout the thirteen-year history of the Latin Grammy Awards, multiple records have been set. This page includes competitive awards only and does not include special awards such as Lifetime Achievement awards or any other non-competitive awards presented by the Latin Academy of Recording Arts & Sciences.

Awards

Most Latin Grammys won
René Pérez Joglar "Residente" has won the most Latin Grammy Awards, winning a total of 27 awards.

Most Latin Grammys won by a male artist

René Pérez Joglar "Residente" with 28 awards, has won more than any other male artist.

Most Latin Grammys won by a female artist

Natalia Lafourcade with 14 awards is the most awarded female artist, followed by Shakira with 12 awards.

Most Latin Grammys won by a group

Calle 13 has won 22 awards, more than any other group.

Most Latin Grammys won by a producer

Juan Luis Guerra with 21 awards has won more awards than any other producer.

Most Latin Grammys won by an engineer or mixer
Thom Russo with 11 awards, has won more than any other engineer or mixer.

Youngest Winner

Jaden from the group Sophia is the youngest Latin Grammy winner. In 2022 he won Best Latin Children's Album at eight years old.

Oldest Winner

Colombian musician Magín Díaz was awarded Best Recording Package for his album, El Orisha de la rosa at age 94 in 2017.

Most Honored Albums

Entren Los Que Quieran by Calle 13 is the most honored album in Latin Grammy history. It won nine awards in 2011.

Most Record of the Year wins

The Record of the Year award is given to the performers, producers, recording engineers, mixing engineers and mastering engineers for commercially released singles or tracks of new vocal or instrumental recordings in Spanish or Portuguese language. Due to the increasing musical changes in the industry, from 2012 the category includes 10 nominees. Alejandro Sanz has won the most awards in the category with five wins out of nine nominations.

Performers

Producers/engineers

Most Album of the Year wins

The Album of the Year award is given to the performers, producers, recording engineers, mixing engineers and mastering engineers for vocal or instrumental albums with 51% of newly recorded material. Due to the increasing musical changes in the industry, from 2012 the category includes 10 nominees. Beginning in 2018, songwriters are eligible for the accolade if 33% of the playing time are written by them. Juan Luis Guerra is the performer with the most wins in the category with four awards, including one as a producer, while Allan Leschhorn has also received four awards as recording and mixing engineer.

Performers

Producers/engineers

Most Song of the Year wins

The Song of the Year award is given to the songwriters of new songs containing at least 51% of lyrics in Spanish or Portuguese language. Instrumental songs and cover versions are not eligible. Due to the increasing musical changes in the industry, from 2012 the category includes 10 nominees. Alejandro Sanz is the most awarded songwriter in the category with four wins out of eight nominations.

Single Ceremony

Most Latin Grammys won in one night

Calle 13 holds the record for most Latin Grammys won in one night with nine wins in 2011.

Most Latin Grammys won by a male artist is one night

Jorge Drexler holds the record for most Latin Grammys won in one night by a male artist with six wins in 2022. Juanes and Juan Luis Guerra follow him with five. Juanes won five awards in 2003 and again in 2008. Juan Luis Guerra won five awards in 2007.

Most Latin Grammys won by a female artist in one night

Shakira and Natalia Lafourcade hold the record for most Latin Grammys won in one night by a female artist which is four. Shakira won four awards in 2006, while Natalia Lafourcade won four awards in 2015.

Most Latin Grammys won by a group in one night

Calle 13 with nine wins in 2011, holds the record for most wins by a group in one night.

Most Latin Grammys awarded to an album on one night

In 2011 Calle 13's Entren Los Que Quieran won nine awards. It won Record of the Year, Album of the Year, Song of the Year, Best Urban Album, Best Urban Song, Best Alternative Song, Best Tropical Song, Producer of the Year and Best Short Form Music Video.

Nominations

Most Latin Grammy nominations

Residente holds the record of most Latin Grammy nominations with 42.

Most Nominations in one night

J Balvin was nominated for thirteen Latin Grammy Awards in 2020.
Calle 13 was nominated for ten Latin Grammy Awards in 2011.
Eduardo Cabra was nominated for ten Latin Grammy Awards in 2014.

See also

Grammy Award records

Notes

References

Latin Grammy Awards